Feedback 86 is the 15th studio album by guitarist Steve Hackett.  The album is a collection of songs written in 1986 but put on the shelf. Some of the songs were supposed to be on the aborted second GTR album. The album features guest appearances by singer Bonnie Tyler, Queen guitarist Brian May, Manfred Mann's Earth Band vocalist Chris Thompson, and Marillion members Ian Mosley and Pete Trewavas.

Track listing
All songs composed by Steve Hackett, except where otherwise noted.
"Cassandra" – 4:07 – lead vocal: Chris Thompson
"Prizefighters" (Hackett, Steve Howe) – 5:13 – lead vocals: Bonnie Tyler & Chris Thompson
"Slot Machine" (Hackett, Brian May) – 4:23 – lead vocal: Chris Thompson & Brian May
"Stadiums of the Damned" – 4:42 – lead vocal: Steve Hackett
"Don't Fall" – 4:25 – lead vocal: Chris Thompson
"Oh How I Love You" – 3:58 – lead vocal: Chris Thompson
"Notre Dame des Fleurs" – 3:11 – instrumental
"The Gulf" – 7:21 – lead vocal: Steve Hackett

Personnel
Steve Hackett – guitar, vocals (1, 2, 3, 4, 5, 8), harmonica (5)
Brian May – guitar (1, 3), vocals (3)
Pete Trewavas – bass (1)
Nick Magnus – keyboards (1, 2, 3, 4, 5, 8), virtual drums (2, 3, 4, 5, 8), piano (6)
Ian Mosley – drums (1)
Bonnie Tyler – vocals (2)
Chris Thompson – vocals (1, 2, 3, 5, 6)
Terry Pack – bass (2)
The Phil Henderson Orchestra (2)

References

2000 albums
Steve Hackett albums